Kai Hua Roh (Thai: ขายหัวเราะ English: To Sell Laugh) is a Thailand comedy comic book launched in 1973 by Editor Vithit Utsahajit. Kai Hua Roh content is a comic strip that offers humorous aspects of life, popular culture, society, politics, entertainment and news. This book also includes several articles about short story, gags from audience and a guest that is a public figure.

History 
Published in 1973 by Vithit Utsahajit , son of the founder of Bunluesarn, Bunlue Utsahajit in the purpose that it will bring entertainment to the readers due to the lack of media at that time.

The name comes from two words “Kai (To Sell)” and “Hua Roh (Laugh)” which Vithit ask an artist from that time before he published the book. At first, Kai Hua Roh was distributed into A4 size paper then changed the size into pocket book for more portability.

Bor Kor Withit 

Editor Withit (Bor Kor Withit) is the Mascot that is associates to Kai Hua Roh and Mahasanook for a long time. This character was inspired by the Editor in chief Vithit Utsahajit. The appearance of this character is a fat and strict editor who always torture the artists. Editor Withit always changes the appearance to match the trend and culture of the time.

Spin-off 
PangPondPangPond (Thai: ปังปอนด์) Monthly comic book by Tai (Pakdee Saetaweesuk) Comic about PangPond

A Flowergirl and Banana boy

A Flowergirl and Banana boy (Thai: สาวดอกไม้กะนายกล้วยไข่) Monthly comic book by Arifen Hazanee that contains a parody of television drama and comic about mythology.

Noo-Hin Inter

Noo-Hin Inter(Thai: หนูหิ่น อินเตอร์) Monthly comic book by Oah about Noo-Hin, rural teenager who comes into Bangkok to work as a maid at Kun Milk’s house.

Mahasanook 
Two years after the first launch of Kai Hua Roh, Bunluesarn published the Mahasanook comic which includes a short story of comic as an additional con. Nowadays, Mahasanook is published as a monthly comic since the 1st issue of 2017.\

References

Sources 
Bunlue Group. (n.d.). Bunlue Gtoup : Contract us. Retrieved January 26, 2017, from Bunlue Grup: http://www.banluegroup.com/web/html/about.php

Lent, J. A. (2014). Southeast Asian Cartoon Art: History, Trends and Problems. Jefferson, North Carolina: McFarland & Company.

Thai Printing Association. (n.d.). ขายหัวเราะ ภารกิจแห่งชาติและรางวัลที่คู่ควร. Retrieved January 26, 2017, from สมาคมการพิมพ์ไทย Thai Printing Association: http://www.thaiprint.org/thaiprint/index.php?option=com_zoo&view=item&item_id=608&Itemid=54

Utsahajit, V. (2013, November 4). เกล็ดแป้งทอด: คุยเรื่องการ์ตูนไทยกับ บก.วิธิต ขายหัวเราะ. (ส. เฮ้งสวัสดิ์, Interviewer)

ขายหัวเราะ. (2017). กรุงเทพมหานคร: บรรลือสาส์น.

External links 
 (Official website)

Thai comics